Sir John Henniker Heaton, 1st Baronet,   (18 May 1848 – 8 September 1914) was a United Kingdom Member of Parliament and a postal reformer and journalist in Australia.

Early life
Heaton was the only son of Lieutenant Colonel John Heaton and his wife, Elizabeth Anne née Henniker, and was born at Rochester, Kent, England. He was educated at Kent House School, Rochester, and King's College London.

Australia

Heaton arrived in Australia in 1864. He found employment at first as a station hand and then joined the staff of the Cumberland Mercury, Parramatta. He had further experience as editor of the Penny Post, Goulburn, and the Times, Parramatta, before joining the Australian Town and Country Journal at Sydney about the year 1871. With this job he came under the influence of the Journal'''s proprietor Samuel Bennett, who Heaton knew as "the best friend I ever had"; on 16 July 1873 he married Bennett's daughter, Rose.

In 1879 he published The Australian Dictionary of Dates and Men of the Time. In 1880 he stood for parliament for the electorate of Young, and was defeated by a few votes. In the following year he went to England and represented New South Wales as a commissioner at the Amsterdam Exhibition of 1883. He also represented Tasmania at the international telegraphic conference held at Berlin, and made his first mark as a reformer by obtaining a reduction in the cost of cable messages to Australia.

British Member of Parliament

Heaton settled back in London in 1884 and at the general election held in 1885 was returned as Conservative member for Canterbury. He held this seat for 25 years, and became well known in the House of Commons for the special interest he showed in postal questions. In 1886, he moved a resolution inviting the government to negotiate with other governments with a view to the establishment of universal penny post. It was defeated, but he succeeded in 1890 in obtaining a reduction in the rate between Great Britain and Australia to twopence halfpenny. In 1898 Imperial penny postage came in except for Australia and New Zealand, who would not agree to it until 1905. It was extended to America in 1908 but still Heaton was not content, and to the end of his days continued to advocate its extension to other countries.

Heaton's interest, however, did not only lie in the obtaining of reductions in the cost of postage. He was able to point out to the Postmaster General various methods of saving costs, and as a result of his efforts considerable savings were made. Heaton made several visits to Australia where he had land and newspaper interests, and began to be recognized as its unofficial member in the House of Commons. He several times refused a knighthood, but valued very much the bestowal of the freedom of the cities of London and of Canterbury in 1899. Following the end of the Second Boer War in June 1902, he visited South Africa in September and October that year. Heaton was a fellow of the Royal Colonial Institute and the Royal Society of Literature, and lectured to the latter on Australian Aboriginals. Chess was his favourite recreation. He also collected books and had a large collection of Australiana that at one stage included the original manuscript Endeavour journal of Sir Joseph Banks.

In 1912 while on a visit to Australia, Heaton was made a baronet, and on his return he was publicly welcomed at the Guildhall and given an illuminated album containing over a thousand signatures of well-known men. The postmaster general, who could not be present, mentioned that in 1910 Heaton on his sixty-second birthday had sent him a list of 62 desirable postal reforms, several of which had already been carried into effect. In August 1914 he became seriously ill while travelling on the continent and died at Geneva on 8 September 1914. Lady Heaton survived him, and his son John became second baronet. His Life and Letters'' by his daughter, Mrs Adrian Porter, was published in 1916. His third son, Herbert, became Governor of the Falkland Islands.

Legacy
Heaton was an amiable, persistent man. He had no special ability as a speaker but, specializing in everything relating to the postal department, he became a formidable critic, and brought about many reforms not only by reducing postage rates but in connexion with parcels post, telegrams, the telephone, and money orders. Underlying all his work was the feeling that the removal of obstacles to communications between different parts of the world would lead to better knowledge and better feeling between nations.

Works

References

B. K. de Garis, 'Heaton, Sir John Henniker (1848 - 1914)', Australian Dictionary of Biography, Volume 4, MUP, 1972, pp 372–37. Retrieved on 13 October 2012

External links

 
 

|-

1848 births
1914 deaths
Alumni of King's College London
Baronets in the Baronetage of the United Kingdom
Companions of the Order of the Bath
Conservative Party (UK) MPs for English constituencies
Knights Commander of the Order of St Michael and St George
People from Rochester, Kent
Politics of Canterbury
UK MPs 1885–1886
UK MPs 1886–1892
UK MPs 1892–1895
UK MPs 1895–1900
UK MPs 1900–1906
UK MPs 1906–1910
Australian book and manuscript collectors